Gene C. McKinney (born November 3, 1950) is a retired United States Army soldier who served as the 10th Sergeant Major of the Army (SMA), serving from July 1995 to October 1997. He was the first African American to reach that rank in the United States Army. In 1998, he was court-martialed on a variety of charges including sexual harassment and obstruction of justice. He was convicted of the obstruction of justice charge and demoted to the rank of master sergeant.

Early life and education
McKinney was born in Monticello, Florida, on November 3, 1950. He is one of six siblings, all of whom served in the United States Army. One served as an officer; one retired as a Master Sergeant; another served in the Vietnam War; and an identical twin, James C. McKinney, was a Command Sergeant Major.

Military career
McKinney enlisted in the United States Army in August 1968, and completed Basic Training as a Cavalryman at Fort Knox, Kentucky. From 1969 to 1970, he saw combat in the Vietnam War with the 173rd Airborne Brigade. In more than 28 years, he served in all noncommissioned officer leadership positions. He was command sergeant major of the United States Army Europe; 8th Infantry Division (Mechanized), Bad Kreuznach, Germany; 1st Brigade, 1st Armored Division in Vilseck, Germany; 612th Quartermaster Battalion at Fort Bragg, North Carolina; 1st Battalion, 58th Mechanized Infantry, 197th Infantry Brigade at Fort Benning, Georgia; 3rd Squadron, 12th Cavalry Regiment in Büdingen, Germany; 3rd and 4th Squadron, 3rd Armored Cavalry Regiment at Fort Bliss, Texas; and 2nd Squadron, 2nd Armored Cavalry Regiment in Bamberg, Germany. He is a graduate of the United States Army Sergeants Major Academy, Class 31.

Sexual harassment allegations and dismissal
In the fall of 1996, allegations of sexual misconduct by training cadre at Aberdeen Proving Ground and several other United States Army postings surfaced, and the Army instituted a substantial investigation with a toll-free telephone hotline that received nearly 60,000 calls within a matter of weeks. The task force established by Secretary of the Army, Togo D. West, Jr., to advise him about the situation included McKinney as the spokesman of the Army enlisted soldiers. In February 1997, McKinney was himself accused by a female former subordinate of improper advances. The Army suspended him from his duties that month while the charges were investigated; in May–October of that year, two Command Sergeants Major one being McKinney's twin brother, James C. McKinney; the other Jerry T. Alley—took over his duties in rotation. While McKinney was suspended from his duties as Sergeant Major of the Army, five more female soldiers accused him of similar improprieties. In November 1997, the Article 32 investigating panel (U.S. military counterpart to a grand jury) completed its investigation and recommended charges for a court-martial. McKinney was thereupon permanently reassigned out of his billet and laterally redesignated to the rank of Command Sergeant Major; his successor, Robert E. Hall, was promptly installed.

McKinney was acquitted of all sexual harassment charges, but was convicted of obstruction of justice and received a reduction in grade to Master Sergeant and a reprimand. Though he retired as a Master Sergeant, his retirement pay was calculated using the pay rate he earned during his tenure as Sergeant Major of the Army, in accordance with 10 USC § 1406(i)(1). That law was subsequently amended by 10 USC § 1406(i)(2)(A) to prevent a recurrence.

Felony vehicular charge
On October 25, 2010, McKinney allegedly hit a man with his car on purpose, and was charged with felony malicious wounding.  This occurred following an incident in which McKinney drove erratically after picking up two slug passengers in Occoquan, Virginia. When the passengers exited the car, one of them attempted to take a photograph of McKinney's license plate, and claimed that McKinney drove his car into him.

Based on the preliminary hearing in April 2011, a judge ruled that the evidence in the case was sufficient to proceed to trial. McKinney was indicted for malicious wounding (a felony) and reckless driving (a misdemeanor).

McKinney submitted an Alford plea, which the court accepted. As a part of his plea agreement the felony charge was reduced to disorderly conduct. He was also sentenced to twelve months of incarceration, of which the judge suspended all but 10 days. McKinney was given credit for time served and only had to serve an additional two days.

Awards and decorations

 9 Service stripes.

References

External links

CNN story on McKinney's acquittal

1950 births
Living people
United States Army personnel of the Vietnam War
African-American United States Army personnel
Sergeants Major of the Army
Recipients of the Legion of Merit
United States Army personnel who were court-martialed
20th-century American criminals
21st-century American criminals
American male criminals
Criminals from Florida
Sexual harassment in the United States
Identical twins
American twins
People from Monticello, Florida
Violence against women in the United States
21st-century African-American people
African Americans in the Vietnam War
20th-century African-American people